William Orme Foster (29 October 1814 – 29 September 1899) was an English ironmaster, coalmaster and owner of the large industrial firm John Bradley & Co, which he inherited from his uncle, James Foster in 1853. He served as a Liberal MP for South Staffordshire from 1857 until 1868.

Biography 
He was born in 1814, the son of William Foster of Wordsley House in Stourbridge and his wife Charlotte, daughter of William Orme of Dulwich, Surrey. His father had an iron business in Stourbridge, a partnership with his brother-in-law trading as Foster & Orme; but it was as heir to his uncle James Foster that William Orme Foster was to achieve wealth and position as an ironmaster in the Midlands region of England.

Foster attended Shrewsbury School between 1826 and 1829. He was employed as an agent by his uncle before 1850. In 1852, he was appointed Deputy Lieutenant for Worcestershire. On James Foster's death in 1853, he inherited the bulk of his estate which was valued at £700,000. It included mines, ironworks, furnaces and engineering works situated at Stourbridge, Shropshire and in the Black Country region of England. The growth of his business was stimulated by booming railways, rails and other equipment being a major product of his works. In 1855, Foster bought the second version of Constable's painting The Lock for £860.

From 1857 until 1868 Foster served as a Member of Parliament for South Staffordshire. He was elected unopposed for this two-member constituency in 1857, 1859 and 1865. After boundary changes, he contested West Staffordshire in 1868, but came only third in the poll for the two-member constituency. In 1867, he was described as: "a Liberal; opposed to the ballot but in favour of a "large and comprehensive measure" of Parliamentary reform.

Other public offices held by Foster included High Sheriff for the County of Wexford in 1876, and High Sheriff for the County of Shropshire in 1883. In 1873 he served as treasurer of the Salop Infirmary in Shrewsbury.

In 1867 Foster bought the Apley Park estate near Bridgnorth in Shropshire, from Douglas Whitmore for over £300,000. The estate included most of Bridgnorth town. In 1873 as landowner he held in England 8,457 acres in Shropshire, 1,917 acres in Worcestershire and 874 acres in Staffordshire, besides 9,724 acres in County Wexford in Ireland.

Under Foster the industrial enterprises such as John Bradley & Co, inherited from his uncle, continued to prosper, the 1860s being particularly good years. John Bradley & Co became one of the largest iron manufacturers in the Midlands, producing wrought iron by the traditional puddling process. However, soon after his loss at the West Staffordshire election of 1868, Foster suffered a "paralytic seizure" which weakened his health and, for many years, he left business affairs with his wife and with his eldest son.  From the 1870s onwards, profits from the business declined as steel manufacturers competed with wrought iron producers and the final decades of the century brought a gradual contraction of iron output. In 1884, Foster attempted unsuccessfully to sell John Bradley & Co. In the same year, he donated the early steam locomotive Agenoria, which had once served his ironworks and mines at Shut End,  to the Science Museum (London).

William Orme Foster died at Apley Hall on 29 September 1899, aged 84, and was buried on 5 October at Stockton. His estate was probated at £2,588,000, and he left his fortune to his son William Henry Foster.

Family
In 1843 Foster married Isabella (died 1910), daughter of Henry Grazebrook of Liverpool, by whom he had two sons (William and James) and four daughters (Charlotte, Constance, Isabella and Julia). It was through his daughter Julia Mary (1860–1931), who married as her first husband Hugh Tyrwhitt, that he became grandfather of the composer Lord Berners.

References

1814 births
1899 deaths
People from Stourbridge
English ironmasters
British businesspeople in the coal industry
Liberal Party (UK) MPs for English constituencies
Whig (British political party) MPs for English constituencies
High Sheriffs of Wexford
High Sheriffs of Shropshire
UK MPs 1857–1859
UK MPs 1859–1865
UK MPs 1865–1868
19th-century English businesspeople